A meteorite mineral is a mineral found chiefly or exclusively within meteorites or meteorite-derived material. This is a list of those minerals, excluding minerals also commonly found in terrestrial rocks. As of 1997 there were approximately 295 mineral species which have been identified in meteorites.

List of meteorite minerals

[] indicates repeating units

See also
 Glossary of meteoritics
 List of minerals

References

 
Meteorite minerals
Meteorite minerals